Parkraemeria is a genus of gobies native to the western Pacific Ocean from the Ryukyus to Australia.

Species
There are currently three recognized species in this genus:
 Parkraemeria ornata Whitley, 1951
 Parkraemeria rhinoceros T. Suzuki & Senou, 2013
 Parkraemeria saltator T. Suzuki & Senou, 2013

References

Gobiidae